Link Access Procedure (LAP) protocols are data link layer protocols for framing and transmitting data across point-to-point links. LAP was originally derived from HDLC (High-Level Data Link Control), but was later updated and renamed LAPB (LAP Balanced).

LAPB is the data link protocol for X.25. Other related LAP protocols are :
MLP (Multilink Procedure)
LAPM (Link Access Procedure for Modems)
LAPF (Link Access Procedure for Frame Relay)

External links
Cisco Frame Relay documentation
X.25 Overview

Link access protocols
Link protocols